Patrick Wackström (born 6 September 1958) is a Finnish former racing cyclist. He won the Finnish national road race title in 1980 and 1981. He also competed at the 1980 and 1984 Summer Olympics.

References

External links
 

1958 births
Living people
Finnish male cyclists
People from Porvoo
Olympic cyclists of Finland
Cyclists at the 1980 Summer Olympics
Cyclists at the 1984 Summer Olympics
Sportspeople from Uusimaa